La Vagabonde may refer to: 
 The Vagabond (novel), a 1910 novel by the French writer Colette
 La Vagabonde (trail), a cycling route (Route Verte) in Quebec
La Vagabonde, catamaran sailed by creators of YouTube channel Sailing La Vagabonde

See also
Le Vagabond or The Littlest Hobo, a Canadian film and television series
Vagabond (disambiguation)